Boo! is a 2018 American horror film directed by Luke Jaden and starring Jaden Piner, Rob Zabrecky, Aurora Perrineau, Charley Palmer Rothwell, Dwight Henry and Jill Marie Jones. It is Jaden's feature directorial debut.

Cast
Jaden Piner
Jill Marie Jones
Aurora Perrineau
Charley Palmer Rothwell
Dwight Henry
Rob Zabrecky

Release
The film premiered at the Brooklyn Horror Film Festival on October 14, 2018.  Vertical Entertainment acquired North American distribution to the film in March 2019.  The film was released on April 12, 2019 in limited theaters and on VOD.

Reception
Anya Stanley of Dread Central awarded the film three stars out of five.  Bradley Gibson of Film Threat gave the film an 8 out of 10.

References

External links
 
 

American horror films
2018 horror films
Films produced by Ben Collins (writer)
Films produced by Luke Piotrowski
Vertical Entertainment films
2010s English-language films
2010s American films